James Levine's 25th Anniversary Metropolitan Opera Gala was a concert, lasting (including intermissions) approximately eight hours, that the Metropolitan Opera staged in 1996 in honour of its then principal conductor and artistic director. Excerpts from the gala were released by Deutsche Grammophon on a 72-minute CD, a 161-minute VHS videocassette and a 161-minute double Laserdisc in 1996, and on a 293-minute double DVD in 2005.

Background
James Levine made his début at the Metropolitan Opera at the age of twenty-seven. On 5 June 1971, he conducted a matinée performance of Tosca with Grace Bumbry in the title role, Franco Corelli as Cavaradossi and Peter Glossop – also making his Met début – as Scarpia. Levine was the longest serving conductor in the Met's history, becoming its principal conductor in 1973, its music director in 1976 and its inaugural artistic director in 1986. At the time of his gala, he had led the Met in 1,646 performances of sixty-eight operas, twenty-one of which he had introduced into the company's repertoire. He had also notably initiated the Met's series of television broadcasts with a production of La Bohème starring Luciano Pavarotti and Renata Scotto in 1977.

The Met celebrated the silver anniversary of Levine's arrival there with a concert on 27 April 1996. Fifty-eight soloists contributed to a gala that lasted from 6 p.m. until 2 a.m. on the following morning. They performed on three sets: an Ezio Frigerio design for Act 1 of Francesca da Rimini, a gift of Mrs Donald D. Harrington; a Günther Schneider-Siemssen design for Act 2 of Arabella, a gift in part of Mrs Michael Falk; and a Schneider-Siemssen design for Act 2 of Tannhäuser, a gift of the Fan Fox and Leslie R. Samuels Foundation and of the Metropolitan Opera Guild. The gala as a whole was sponsored by Mrs Emily Fisher Landau. Its television broadcast was sponsored by Mrs Harrington, the Texaco Philanthropic Foundation, Inc., and the National Endowment For the Arts, in association with Deutsche Grammophon, the United Kingdom's BBC Worldwide Television, Japan's NHK, Holland's Nederlandse Programma Stichting, Denmark's Danmarks Radio, the Australian Broadcasting Corporation and Sweden's Sveriges Television.

DVD chapter listing

Disc 1
 1 (1:51) Opening credits
Set design for Act 1 of Francesca da Rimini by Ezio Frigerio (1930–2022)

Richard Wagner (1813–1883)

Rienzi, der letzte der Tribunen ("Rienzi, the last of the tribunes", WWV 49, Dresden, 1842), with a libretto by Wagner after Rienzi, the last of the Roman tribunes (1835) by Edward Bulwer-Lytton (1803–1873)
 2 (12:46) Overture
Tannhäuser und der Sängerkrieg auf Wartburg ("Tannhäuser and the Wartburg song contest", WWV 70, Dresden, 1845), with a libretto by Wagner after the German legends of Tannhäuser and the Wartburg Sängerkrieg (minstrels' contest) 
 3 (3:44) "Dich, teure Halle", with Deborah Voigt (Elisabeth)
Giuseppe Verdi (1813–1901)

Don Carlo (Paris, 1867), with an Italian libretto by Achille de Lauzieres and Angelo Zanardini, translated from the French of Joseph Méry (1797–1866) and Camille du Locle (1832–1903), after the play Don Carlos, Infant von Spanien ("Don Carlos, Infante of Spain", Hamburg, 1787) by Friedrich Schiller (1759–1805)
 4 (12:16) "Restate!... O Signor, di Fiandra arrivo", with Thomas Hampson (Rodrigo) and Roberto Scandiuzzi (Filippo II)
Gustave Charpentier (1860–1956)

Louise (Paris, 1900), with a libretto by Charpentier and Saint-Pol-Roux (1861–1940)
 5 (6:28) "Depuis le jour où je me suis donnée", with Renée Fleming (Louise)
Pietro Mascagni (1863–1945)

L'amico Fritz ("Friend Fritz", Rome, 1891), with a libretto by Nicola Daspuro (1853–1941, writing as P. Suardon) and Giovanni Targioni-Tozzetti (1863–1934) after L'ami Fritz by Émile Erckmann (1822–1899) and Pierre-Alexandre Chatrian
 6 (9:55) "Suzel, buon di", with Angela Gheorghiu (Suzel) and Roberto Alagna (Fritz)
Franz Lehár (1870–1948)

 7 (5:20) "Ich weiß es selber nicht... Meine Lippen, sie küssen so heiß", with Ileana Cotrubas (Giuditta)
Giuseppe Verdi

Don Carlo
 8 (5:38) "Ah, più non vedrò... O don fatale", with Dolora Zajick (Eboli)
Set design for Act 2 of Arabella by Günther Schneider-Siemssen (1926–2015)

Georges Bizet (1838–1875)

Les pêcheurs de perles ("The pearl fishers", Paris, 1867), with a libretto by Eugène Cormon (1810–1903) and Michel Carré (1821–1872)
 9 (6:44) "Au fond du temple saint", with Roberto Alagna (Nadir) and Bryn Terfel (Zurga)
Charles Gounod (1818–1893)

Roméo et Juliette (Paris, 1867), with a libretto by Jules Barbier (1825–1901) and Michel Carré after Romeo and Juliet (circa 1593) by William Shakespeare (1564–1616)
10 (4:36) "Je veux vivre dans ce rêve", with Ruth Ann Swenson (Juliette)
Johann Strauss II (1825–1899)

Die Fledermaus ("The flittermouse", Vienna, 1874), with a libretto by Karl Haffner (1804–1876) and Richard Genée (1823–1895) after Le réveillon ("The supper party", Paris, 1872) by Henri Meilhac (1830–1897) and Ludovic Halévy (1834–1908), after Das Gefängnis ("The prison", Berlin, 1851) by Julius Roderich Benedix (1811–1873)
11 (5:03) "Dieser Anstand, so manierlich", with Karita Mattila (Rosalinde) and Håkan Hagegård (Eisenstein)
Richard Wagner

Tristan und Isolde (WWV 90, München, 1865), with a libretto by Wagner after Tristan by Gottfried von Strassburg (d. circa 1210)
12 (11:06) "Wie lachend sie mir Lieder singen", with Waltraud Meier (Isolde)
Giuseppe Verdi

Luisa Miller (Naples, 1849), with a libretto by Salvadore Cammarano (1801–1852) after Kabale und Liebe ("Intrigue and love", Frankfurt am Main, 1784) by Friedrich Schiller
13 (7:11) "Oh! Fede negar potessi agl'occhi miei!... Quando le sere al placido", with Carlo Bergonzi (Rodolfo)
Set design for Act 2 of Tannhäuser by Günther Schneider-Siemssen

Pyotr Ilyich Tchaikovsky (1840–1893)

Eugene Onegin (Op. 24, Moscow, 1879), with a libretto by Tchaikovsky and Konstantin Shilovsky after Eugene Onegin (published serially, 1825–1832) by Alexander Pushkin (1799–1837)
14 (14:56) "O! Kak mnye tyazhelo", with Catherine Malfitano (Tatyana) and Dwayne Croft (Eugene Onegin)
Camille Saint-Saëns (1835–1921)

Samson et Dalila (Op. 47, Weimar, 1877), with a libretto by Ferdinand Lemaire (1832–1879) after the story of Samson and Delilah in Chapter 16 of the Book of Judges in the Old Testament
15 (6:25) "Mon cœur s'ouvre à ta voix", with Grace Bumbry (Dalila)
Jacques Offenbach (1819–1880)

La Périchole ("The Peruvienne", Paris, 1868), with a libretto by Henri Meilhac and Ludovic Halévy after Le carrosse de Saint-Sacrement ("The Saint-Sacrement coach") by Prosper Mérimée (1803–1871)
16 (2:38) "Ah! Quel dîner je viens de faire", with Frederica von Stade (La Périchole)
Richard Strauss (1864–1949)

Der Rosenkavalier ("The knight of the rose", Op. 59, Dresden, 1911), with a libretto by Hugo von Hofmannsthal (1874–1929) after Les amours du chevalier de Faubles by Jean-Baptiste Louvet de Couvrai (1760–1797) and Monsieur de Pourceaugnac (1669) by Molière (1622–1673)
17 (6:05) "Hab mir's gelobt", with Renée Fleming (Feldmarschallin), Anne Sofie von Otter (Octavian) and Heidi Grant Murphy (Sophie von Faninal)
Charles Gounod

Faust (Paris, 1859), with a libretto by Jules Barbier and Michel Carré from Carré's play Faust et Marguerite after Faust: Eine Tragödie ("Faust, a tragedy", 1808) by Johann Wolfgang von Goethe (1749–1832)
18 (10:30) "Mais ce Dieu, que peut-il pour moi?", with Plácido Domingo (Faust) and Samuel Ramey (Méphistophélès)
Wolfgang Amadeus Mozart (1756–1791)

Il dissoluto punito, ossia il Don Giovanni ("The rake punished, or Don Giovanni", K. 527, Prague, 1787), with a libretto by Lorenzo da Ponte (1749–1838) after El burlador de Seville y convivado de piedra ("The trickster of Seville and the stone guest", ?1616) by Tirso de Molina (1579–1648)
19 (8:57) "Di molte faci il lume... Sola, sola in buio loco", with Renée Fleming (Donna Anna), Kiri Te Kanawa (Donne Elvira), Hei-Kyung Hong (Zerlina), Jerry Hadley (Don Ottavio), Bryn Terfel (Leporello) and Julien Robbins (Masetto)

Disc 2
 1 (1:06) Opening
Set design for Act 1 of Francesca da Rimini by Ezio Frigerio

John Corigliano (born 1938)

The ghosts of Versailles (New York, 1991), with a libretto by William M. Hoffman (1939–2017) after L'autre Tartuffe, ou La mère coupable ("The other Tartuffe, or The guilty mother", Paris, 1792) by Pierre Beaumarchais
 2 (9:18) "Cherubino...", "Now we go back in time", with Hei-Kyung Hong (Rosina), Wendy White (Cherubino), Christine Goerke (Marie Antoinette) and Håkan Hagegård (Pierre Beaumarchais)
Giuseppe Verdi

Un ballo in maschera (Rome, 1859), with a libretto by Antonio Somma (1809–1864) after that written by Eugène Scribe (1791–1861) for Gustave III, ou Le bal masqué by Daniel Auber (1782–1871)
 3 (5:24) "Ahimè! S'appressa alcun!", with Ghena Dimitrova (Amelia), Franco Farina (Riccardo) and Juan Pons (Renato)
Antonín Dvořák (1841–1904)

Rusalka ("The water spirit", Prague, 1901), with a libretto by Jaroslav Kvapil (1868–1950) after Undine (1811) by Friedrich de la Motte Fouqué (1777–1843), Den lille havfreu ("The little mermaid", 1837) by Hans Christian Andersen (1805–1875) and the north-west European folk tradition of Melusine
 4 (7:13) Song to the Moon: "Měsíčku na nebi hlubokém", with Gabriela Beňačková (Rusalka)
Richard Wagner

Die Walküre ("The Valkyrie", WWV 86B, Munich, 1870), with a libretto by Wagner
 5 (18:44) "Leb wohl, du kühnes, herrliches Kind!", with James Morris (Wotan)
Set design for Act 2 of Arabella by Günther Schneider-Siemssen

Giuseppe Verdi

Ernani (Venice, 1844), with a libretto by Francesco Maria Piave (1810–1876) after Hernani (1830) by Victor Hugo (1802–1885)
 6 (13:01) "Cessaro i suoni", with Deborah Voigt (Elvira), Plácido Domingo (Ernani) and Roberto Scandiuzzi (Silva)
Wolfgang Amadeus Mozart

Le nozze di Figaro ("The marriage of Figaro", K. 492, Vienna, 1786), with a libretto by Lorenzo da Ponte after La folle journée, ou Le Mariage de Figaro ("The mad day, or The marriage of Figaro", 1784) by Pierre Beaumarchais (1732–1799)
 7 (5:42) "Giunse alfin il momento... Deh! Vieni, non tardar", with Dawn Upshaw (Susanna)
Umberto Giordano (1867–1948)

Andrea Chénier (Milan, 1896), with a libretto by Luigi Illica (1857–1919) based on the life of the poet André Chénier (1762–1794)
 8 (6:48) "Esito dunque?... Nemico della patria", with Sherrill Milnes (Gérard)
Gaetano Donizetti (1797–1848)

Don Pasquale (Paris, 1843), with a libretto by Donizetti and Giovanni Ruffini (1807–1881) after that written by Angelo Anelli (1761–1820) for Ser Marcantonio (Milan, 1810) by Stefano Pavesi (1779–1850)
 9 (9:18) "Don Pasquale?... Cheti, cheti, immantinente", with Mark Oswald (Malatesta) and Paul Plishka (Don Pasquale)
Jacques Offenbach

Les contes d'Hoffmann ("The tales of Hoffmann", Paris, 1881), with a libretto by Jules Barbier, after Les contes fantastiques d'Hoffmann ("The fantastic tales of Hofmann") by Jules Barbier and Michel Carré, after Der Sandmann ("The Sandman", 1816), Rath Krespel ("Councillor Krespel", 1818) and Das verlorene Spiegelbild ("The lost reflection", from Die Abenteuer der Sylvester-Nacht, ["The adventures of New Year's Eve", 1814]) by E. T. A. Hoffmann (1776–1822)
10 (5:13) "Hélas, mon cœur s'égare encore", with Florence Quivar (Giulietta), Rosalind Elias (Niklausse), Alfredo Kraus (Hoffmann), Charles Anthony (Pitichinaccio), James Courtney (Schlémil), Paul Plishka (Dapertutto) and the Metropolitan Opera Chorus
Set design for Act 2 of Tannhäuser by Günther Schneider-Siemssen

Giuseppe Verdi

I Lombardi alla prima crociata ("The Lombards in the first crusade", Milan, 1843), with a libretto by Temistocle Solera (1815–1878) after I Lombardi alla prima crociata (1826) by Tommaso Grossi (1791–1853)
11 (13:46) "Qui posa il fianco... Qual voluttà trascorrere", with June Anderson (Giselda), Carlo Bergonzi (Oronte), Ferruccio Furlanetto (Pagano) and Raymond Gniewek (violin solo)
Wolfgang Amadeus Mozart

Così fan tutte, ossia La scuola degli amanti ("Thus do all women, or The school for lovers", K. 588, Vienna, 1790), with a libretto by Lorenzo da Ponte
12 (5:35) "Sorella, cosa dici?... Prenderò quel brunettino", with Carol Vaness (Fiordiligi) and Susanne Mentzer (Dorabella)
Giuseppe Verdi

Un ballo in maschera
13 (5:34) "Morrò, ma prima in grazia", with Aprile Millo (Amelia)
Richard Wagner

Götterdämmerung ("Twilight of the gods", WWV 86D, Bayreuth, 1876), with a libretto by Wagner
14 (20:05) "Starke Scheite schichtet mir dort", with Jane Eaglen (Brünnhilde)
Wolfgang Amadeus Mozart

Il dissoluto punito, ossia il Don Giovanni
15 (7:00) "In quali eccessi, o numi... Mi tradì quell'alma ingrata", with Kiri Te Kanawa (Donna Elvira)
A tribute
16 (5:56) Concluding encomium by Birgit Nilsson
Richard Wagner

Die Meistersinger von Nürnberg ("The mastersingers of Nuremberg", WWV 96, Munich, 1868), with a libretto by Wagner
17 (11:47) "Wach auf!", with the Metropolitan Opera Chorus

Laserdisc and VHS videocassette chapter listing

Laserdisc side 1
Richard Wagner

Rienzi, der letzte der Tribunen
 1 (12:48) Overture
Tannhäuser und der Sängerkrieg auf Wartburg
 2 (3:47) "Dich, teure Halle", with Deborah Voigt (Elisabeth)
Giuseppe Verdi

Don Carlo
 3 (12:19) "Restate!... O Signor, di Fiandra arrivo", with Thomas Hampson (Rodrigo) and Roberto Scandiuzzi (Filippo II)
Gustave Charpentier

Louise
 4 (6:29) "Depuis le jour où je me suis donnée", with Renée Fleming (Louise)
Pietro Mascagni

L'amico Fritz
 5 (9:54) "Suzel, buon di", with Angela Gheorghiu (Suzel) and Roberto Alagna (Fritz)
Franz Lehár

Giuditta
 6 (5:24) "Ich weiß es selber nicht... Meine Lippen, sie küssen so heiß", with Ileana Cotrubas (Giuditta)

Laserdisc side 2
Giuseppe Verdi

Don Carlo
 7 (5:21) ""Ah, più non vedrò... O don fatale", with Dolora Zajick (Eboli)
Richard Wagner

Die Walküre
 8 (5:27) "Loge, hör", with James Morris (Wotan)
Georges Bizet

Les pêcheurs de perles
 9 (7:05) "Au fond du temple saint", with Roberto Alagna (Nadir) and Bryn Terfel (Zurga)
Charles Gounod

Roméo et Juliette
10 (4:37) "Je veux vivre dans ce rêve", with Ruth Ann Swenson (Juliet)
Johann Strauss II

Die Fledermaus
11 (5:04) "Dieser Anstand, so manierlich",  with Karita Mattila (Rosalinde) and Håkan Hagegård (Eisenstein)
Richard Wagner

Tristan und Isolde
12 (11:07) "Wie lachend sie mir Lieder singen", with Waltraud Meier (Isolde)
Giuseppe Verdi

Luisa Miller
13 (7:15) "Oh! Fede negar potesse agl'occhi miei!... Quando le sere al placido", with Carlo Bergonzi (Rodolfo)
Pyotr Ilyich Tchaikovsky

Eugene Onegin
14 (15:35) "O. Kak mnye tyazhelo", with Catherine Malfitano (Tatyana) and Dwayne Croft (Eugene Onegin)

Laserdisc side 3
Camille Saint-Saëns

Samson et Dalila
15 (6:31) "Mon cœur s'ouvre à ta voix", with Grace Bumbry (Dalila)
Jacques Offenbach

La Périchole
16 (2:33) "Ah! Quel dîner je viens de faire", with Frederica von Stade (La Périchole)
Richard Strauss

Der Rosenkavalier
17 (6:12) "Hab mir's gelobt", with Renée Fleming (Feldmarschallin), Anne Sofie von Otter (Octavian) and Heidi Grant Murphy (Sophie von Faninal)
Charles Gounod

Faust
18 (10:32) "Mais ce Dieu, que peut-il pour moi?", with Plácido Domingo (Faust) and Samuel Ramey (Méphistophélès)
Wolfgang Amadeus Mozart

Il dissoluto punito, ossia il Don Giovanni
19 (8:59) "Di molte faci il lume... Sola, sola, in buio loco", with Renée Fleming (Donna Anna), Kiri Te Kanawa (Donna Elvira), Hei-Kyung Hong (Zerlina), Jerry Hadley (Don Ottavio), Bryn Terfel (Leporello) and Julien Robbins (Masetto) 
Tribute
20 (3:51) Concluding encomium by Birgit Nilsson
Richard Wagner

Die Meistersinger von Nürnberg
21 (8:43) "Wach auf, es nahet gen den Tag!", with the Metropolitan Opera Chorus

CD track listing
Georges Bizet

Les pêcheurs de perles
 1 (6:12) "Au fond du temple saint", with Roberto Alagna  (Nadir) and Bryn Terfel (Zurga)
Gustave Charpentier

Louise
 2 (5:56) "Depuis le jour", with Renée Fleming (Louise)
Charles Gounod

Faust
 3 (10:01) "Mais ce Dieu, que peut-il pour moi?", with Plácido Domingo (Faust) and Samuel Ramey (Méphistophélès)
Franz Lehár

Giuditta
 4 (4:58) "Ich weiß es selber nicht... Mein Lippen, sie küssen so heiß", with Ileana Cotrubas (Giuditta)

Giuseppe Verdi

Don Carlo
 5 (5:00) "Ah, più non vedrò... O don fatale", with Dolora Zajick (Eboli)
Wolfgang Amadeus Mozart

Il dissoluto punito, ossia il Don Giovanni
 6 (8:28) "Di molte faci il lume... Sola, sola, in buio loco", with Renée Fleming (Donna Anna), Kiri Te Kanawa (Donna Elvira), Hei-Kyung Hong (Zerlina), Jerry Hadley (Don Ottavio), Bryn Terfel (Leporello) and Julien Robbins (Masetto)
Charles Gounod

Roméo et Juliette
 7 (4:11) "Je veux vivre dans ce rêve", with Ruth Ann Swenson (Juliette)
Johann Strauss II

Die Fledermaus
 8 (4:41) "Dieser Anstand, so manierlich", with Karita Mattila (Rosalinde) and Håkan Hagegård (Eisenstein)
Jules Massenet (1842–1912)

Werther (Geneva, 1892), with a libretto by Édouard Blau (1836–1906), Paul Milliet (1848–1924) and Georges Hartmann (1843–1900, writing as Henri Grémont) after Die Leiden des jungen Werthers ("The sorrows of young Werther", 1774) by Johann Wolfgang von Goethe
 9 (2:49) "Pourquoi me réveiller", with Alfredo Kraus (Werther)
Camille Saint-Saëns

Samson et Dalila
10 (5:57) "Mon cœur s'ouvre à ta voix", with Grace Bumbry (Dalila)
Richard Wagner

Tannhäuser und der Sängerkrieg auf Wartburg
11 (3:22) "Dich, teure Halle", with Deborah Voigt (Elisabeth)
Jacques Offenbach

La Périchole
12 (2:11) "Ah! Quel dîner je viens de faire", with Frederica von Stade (La Périchole)
Richard Strauss

Der Rosenkavalier
13 (6:01) "Hab mir's gelobt", with Renée Fleming (Feldmarschallin), Anne Sofie von Otter (Octavian) and Heidi Grant Murphy (Sophie von Faninal)
A tribute
14 (2:42) Concluding encomium by Birgit Nilsson

Personnel

Artists

 Roberto Alagna (born 1963), tenor
 June Anderson (born 1952), soprano
 Charles Anthony (1929–2012), tenor
 Gabriela Beňačková (born 1947), soprano
 Carlo Bergonzi (1924–2014), tenor
 Grace Bumbry (born 1937), mezzo-soprano
 Ileana Cotrubas (born 1939), soprano
 James Courtney, bass-baritone
 Dwayne Croft, baritone 
 Ghena Dimitrova (1941–2005), soprano
 Plácido Domingo (born 1941), tenor
 Jane Eaglen (born 1960), soprano
 Rosalind Elias (born 1929), mezzo-soprano
 Franco Farina, tenor
 Renée Fleming (born 1959), soprano
 Ferruccio Furlanetto (born 1949), bass
 Angela Gheorghiu (born 1965), soprano
 Christine Goerke (born 1969), soprano
 Jerry Hadley (1952–2007), tenor
 Håkan Hagegård (born 1945), baritone
 Thomas Hampson (born 1955), baritone
 Hei-Kyung Hong (born 1959), soprano
 Kiri Te Kanawa (born 1944), soprano
 Alfredo Kraus (1927–1999), tenor
 Catherine Malfitano (born 1948), soprano
 Karita Mattila (born 1960), soprano
 Waltraud Meier (born 1956), soprano
 Susanne Mentzer (born 1957), mezzo-soprano
 Aprile Millo (born 1958), soprano
 Sherrill Milnes (born 1935), baritone
 James Morris (born 1947), bass-baritone
 Heidi Grant Murphy (born 1965), soprano
 Anne Sofie von Otter (born 1955), mezzo-soprano
 Mark Oswald, baritone
 Paul Plishka (born 1941), bass
 Juan Pons (born 1946), baritone
 Florence Quivar (born 1944), mezzo-soprano
 Julien Robbins, bass-baritone
 Roberto Scandiuzzi (born 1958), bass
 Frederica von Stade (born 1945), mezzo-soprano
 Ruth Ann Swenson (born 1959), soprano
 Bryn Terfel (born 1965), bass-baritone
 Dawn Upshaw (born 1960), soprano
 Carol Vaness (born 1952), soprano
 Deborah Voigt (born 1960), soprano
 Wendy White (born 1953), mezzo-soprano
 Dolora Zajick (born 1952), mezzo-soprano
 Raymond Gniewek (born 1931), concertmaster
 Metropolitan Opera Orchestra
 Metropolitan Opera Chorus
 Raymond Hughes, chorus master
 James Levine (1943–2021), conductor

Metropolitan Opera personnel

 Gil Wechsler, lighting designer
 George Darden, musical preparation
 Joan Dornemann, musical preparation
 Dennis Giauque, musical preparation
 Kemal Khan, musical preparation
 Robert Morrison, musical preparation
 Kevin Murphy, musical preparation
 Richard Woitach, musical preparation
 Phebe Berkowitz, stage director
 David Kneuss, stage director
 Robin Guarino, assistant stage director
 Catherine Hazlehurst, assistant stage director
 Peter McClintock, assistant stage director
 Fabrizio Melano, assistant stage director
 Paul Mills, assistant stage director
 Stephen Pickover, assistant stage director
 Sharon Thomas, assistant stage director
 Jane Klaviter, prompter
 Donna Racik, prompter
 Susan Webb, prompter
 Thomas H. Connell III, stage manager
 Stephen A. Brown, stage manager
 Gary Dietrich, stage manager
 William McCourt, stage manager
 Raymond Menard, stage manager
 Scott Moon, stage manager
 Stephen Diaz, master carpenter
 George Green, master electrician
 Edward McConway, properties master
 Magda Szayer, wig and hair stylist
 Victor Callegari, make-up artist
 William Malloy, wardrobe supervisor
 Lesley Weston, costume shop head
 Ray Diffen, costume designer
 Sylvia Nolan, costume designer

Broadcast personnel

 Brian Large (born 1939), director
 Louise Briccetti, producer
 Susan Erben, associate producer
 Jay David Saks, audio producer
 Jay Millard, associate director
 Mark Schubin, engineer-in-charge
 Ron Washburn, technical supervisor and camera operator
 Greg Overton, technical director
 Bill King, audio supervisor
 Michael Shoskes, audio engineer
 Mel Becker, audio engineer
 Paul Cohen, audio engineer
 Jim Jordan, audio engineer
 Susan Noll, video engineer
 Matty Randazzo, video engineer
 Paul Ranieri, video engineer 
 William Steinberg, video engineer
 Miguel Armstrong, camera operator
 Juan Barrera, camera operator
 Jim Covello, camera operator
 John Feher, camera operator
 Manny Gutierrez, camera operator
 Jake Ostroff, camera operator
 Manny Rodriguez, camera operator
 Jim Scurti, camera operator
 David Smith, camera operator
 Shaun Harkins, remote camera technician
 Alan Buchner, videotape engineer
 Deborah Cavanaugh, electronic graphics
 Terence Benson, television stage manager
 Rose Riggins, television stage manager
 Karen McLaughlin, score reader
 Victoria Warivonchik, production associate
 Joseph Sbarra, production secretary
 Frances Egler, production assistant
 Aileen Forbes, production assistant
 Brian McCotter, production assistant
 James Simpson, production assistant
 Kevin Wilkin, production assistant
 Laura Tolkow, title graphics
 Jim Naughton, production facilities
 Jim Will, production facilities
 Unitel Mobile Video, production facilities
 David Hewitt, remote recording services
 Phil Gitomer, remote recording services

DVD production personnel

 Roland Ott, project manager
 Burkhard Bartsch, project coordinator
 Johannes Müller, producer, msm-Studios GmbH, Munich
 Hermann Enkemeier, screen designer, msm-Studios
 Christian Müller, video encoding and authoring, msm-Studios
 Claudia Pohl, AMSI II mastering, Emil Berliner Studios
 Udo Potratz, AMSI II mastering, Emil Berliner Studios
 Sonya Friedman, subtitles
 Eva Reisinger, booklet editor
 Merle Kersten, booklet art director

Critical reception
Mike Silverman reviewed the gala for the Associated Press on 28 April 1996. It was not until the early hours, he wrote, that the Met's audience heard Birgit Nilsson paying tribute to James Levine with a few bars of "Ho-jo-to-ho" from her signature role, Brünnhilde. Despite the absence of some singers, like Ben Heppner, due to scheduling clashes, and of others, like Cecilia Bartoli and Luciano Pavarotti, due to health issues, the concert was a "thrilling, if exhausting spectacle" replete with vocal talent. The gala's cast list ranged from veterans like the 71-year-old Carlo Bergonzi to newcomers like the 32-year-old Roberto Alagna.

Alagna was more impressive than he had been in a recent La Bohème. His contributions to the Pearlfishers' Duet and the Cherry Duet from L'amico Fritz were both lovely. Two other young tenors – Jerry Hadley and Richard Leech – both sang well too, but no other representatives of their peer group put in an appearance: instead the Met heard the elderly Bergonzi and Alfredo Kraus and the 55-year-old Plácido Domingo, as suave as usual in a trio from Ernani and a duet from Faust.

Bryn Terfel displayed his "ebullient" Leporello in addition to duetting with Alagna in Bizet, his "booming, mellifluous baritone and utter ease and gracefulness as a performer [marking] him as one in a million". He was "sure to be one of the superstars of the next generation".

The best of the evening's female singers was Renée Fleming, "whose soprano voice is as beautiful as any in memory". She was luminous in Louise and Der Rosenkavalier, abetted in the latter by gorgeous singing from Heidi Grant Murphy and Anne Sofie von Otter. Her inclusion in a sextet from Don Giovanni made her the only soloist to be heard more than twice.

Wagner enthusiasts would undoubtedly be encouraged by the Immolation Scene from Götterdämmerung delivered by Jane Eaglen, a British dramatic soprano whose recent success in Wagner in Chicago had evidently not been a flash in the pan. She was worthy to share a billing with Birgit Nilsson. On the last occasion on which Nilsson had appeared at the Met, in its 1983 Centennial Gala, she had sung Isolde's Narrative and Curse. In the Levine gala, that was the passage offered by Waltraud Meier. Her performance was "thrilling", but she was a mezzo-soprano venturing into soprano territory, and the stress evident in her highest notes made one anxious as to whether she was pursuing a path that was right for her.

Dawn Upshaw was "typically simple, silvery and winning" in Mozart's "Deh! Vieni, non tardar". "The contrast could not have been more striking with the number that preceded it - a mannered, diva-ish rendition by Jessye Norman, with high notes that consistently went flat, of an aria from Berlioz's Damnation of Faust".

Levine did not avail himself of the opportunity to make any speeches, but merely "conducted the Met's wonderful orchestra with love and enthusiasm".

Tim Page reviewed the gala in The Washington Post on 29 April 1996. It was, he wrote, a "glorious, crazy, songful party". Not all the most distinguished opera singers were present: José Carreras had a previous commitment, Montserrat Caballé, Marilyn Horne and Teresa Stratas were ill and Kathleen Battle had been fired from the Met in 1994. But the concert still presented an astonishing constellation of some of opera's brightest stars.

Dominated by Mozart, Verdi and Wagner, the gala's programme was typical of the repertoire of the Levine era but lacked any unifying theme otherwise. It was "a sort of melodious circus – a celestial vaudeville". There were consequently many awkward transitions. For example, Jane Eaglen's noble rendition of the immolation scene from Götterdämmerung was followed by the broad comedy of Frederica von Stade in the tipsy aria from La Périchole; the effect was to "dissipate the solemn afterglow of the one and make the other seem goofy and tasteless".

Von Stade also supplied "one of the evening's true glories" in a performance of Cherubino's "Voi che sapete" [omitted from DG's DVD and CD]. "Opera has recently offered little more wonderful than von Stade's interpretation of that famous ardent, hormone-crazed pubescent boy". Also outstanding were Carlo Bergonzi and Alfredo Kraus, skillfully making the most of resources depleted by old age; Ileana Cotrubas, "ripely and irresistibly nostalgic" in Giuditta; Plácido Domingo, combining "magnificent vocalizing and the most acute artistic intelligence" in Ernani and Faust; Renée Fleming, "luscious and immaculate" in Louise, Don Giovanni and Der Rosenkavalier; Waltraud Meier, singing Isolde's curse with "thrilling ferocity"; and Ruth Ann Swenson, compensating for her technical deficiencies in a coloratura showpiece from Roméo et Juliette with character and intelligence.

There were disappointments too. Håkan Hagegård and Karita Mattila were guilty of "campy snickering" in Die Fledermaus. Jerry Hadley perpetrated "vulgar Mario Lanza-isms" in The land of smiles [also omitted by DG]. Ghena Dimitrova, Franco Farina and Juan Pons were "third-rate" in Un ballo in maschera. And Sharon Sweet's mere appearance at the gala was "difficult to explain".

Of especial interest were two prominent up and coming artists, Roberto Alagna and Angela Gheorghiu [appearing one day after their wedding]. Alagna had "a light, sweet and supple voice of moderate size (some high notes that were both delicate and ringing) and a not inconsiderable dramatic ability", but it was far too soon to bracket him with Carreras, Domingo and Pavarotti. Gheorghiu was much more impressive, with "a voice of unusual and haunting timbre, a distinctive creative personality [and] attention to the sheer phonic sound of the words she sings".

None of the soloists, though, could outshine the orchestra and their conductor. Thanks to Levine, the Met's pit was home to "one of the most responsive and virtuosic ensembles in the world", and it was remarkable that he could "preside so effortlessly and so idiomatically over such a range of musical styles, over so many hours".

Martin Bernheimer reviewed the gala in The Los Angeles Times on 29 April 1996. It was, he wrote, a "mega-monster concert", a "shameless, shapeless, formless smorgasbord of arias and ensembles", "a parade of disparate singers striking poses in competitive evening attire" in which "the assembled women blew a crescendo of kisses to their beaming boss out front".

The gala began with a somewhat lethargic treatment of the overture to Rienzi. Newlyweds Roberto Alagna and Angela Gheorghiu were clear, refined and sugary in the Cherry Duet from L'amico Fritz. Dolora Zajick sang with "full-throated bravura" in Eboli's "O don fatale". Waltraud Meier was incandescent in Isolde's Narrative and Curse. Carlo Bergonzi was touching and elegant in Luisa Miller. Alfredo Kraus amazed with his suavity and staying power as Werther and Hoffmann. Raymond Gniewek played an exquisite  violin solo in I Lombardi. Catherine Malfitano and Dwayne Croft provided one of the evening's most successful passages of authentic music drama in a pyrexic scene from Eugene Onegin.

Jane Eaglen, "a Wagnerian diva straight from a New Yorker cartoon", showed that it did not much matter what Brünnhilde looked like if she had a voice as  overwhelming as a tsunami. Sharon Sweet was "strident" in La forza del destino. Frederica von Stade demonstrated that "charm conquers all" with "her still boyish Cherubino and irresistibly tipsy Périchole". Karita Mattila and Hakån Hagegård were almost as seductive in a flirtatious Watch Duet from Die Fledermaus. Birgit Nilsson provided the gala's most exhilarating tribute to Levine with a trumpet-like Valkyrie war-cry.

Plácido Domingo and Samuel Ramey were comfortingly stellar in "Faust", Ramey for once being allowed to perform without baring his chest. Deborah Voigt, Bryn Terfel, Ruth Ann Swenson, Aprile Millo and Gabriela Beňačková were equally impressive in their celestial wattage.

As far as clothing was concerned, the contributors most deserving of an award were Ileana Cotrubas for sporting a "gigantic Christmas bow", Mark Oswald for losing his tie and vest in Don Pasquale and "the various cleavage divas who lent new meaning to the concept of heaving bosoms".

Jessye Norman perpetrated the evening's "most mannered" selection in a "crooned, roared and sighed" performance of "D'amour l'ardente flamme" that was so erratic in pitch as to present Berlioz as bitonal. Grace Bumbry was a wobbly old Dalila, and Gwyneth Jones an even wobblier Turandot. Dawn Upshaw's eloquent ornamentation in a "silver-bell" "Deh! Vieni, non tardar" was jarringly followed by the Jerry Hadley slathering on the schmalz in "Dein ist mein ganzes Herz". Maria Ewing "yowled" Gershwin's "My man's gone now" with her hands rather oddly thrust into her pockets. Kiri Te Kanawa's honeyed performance of an aria from Don Giovanni was accompanied by "comic-vamp routines". Ghena Dimitrova, Franco Farina and Juan Pons sang a trio from Un ballo in maschera as though working in some theatre in the provinces.

Renée Fleming provided the most beautiful vocalism of the entire concert in her excerpts from Louise and Der Rosenkavalier. James Morris, on the other hand, raised concerns for the health of his voice by the way in which he delivered Wotan's Farewell in his "fraying basso". James Levine's guidance of his excellent orchestra was "sympathetic if sometimes loud and sometimes inflexible".

Neil Crory reviewed the gala on Laserdisc in the Fall 1997 issue of Opera Canada. It was, he wrote, "the gala-to-end-all-galas". Its programme booklet's cancellation list alone deserved a mention in The Guinness Book of Records, with Cecilia Bartoli, Hildegard Behrens, Nicolai Ghiaurov, Marilyn Horne and Luciano Pavarotti all pleading illness.

The gala had not been consistent in quality. There were "a few blazing performances", but also "many that merely smouldered and others that simply failed to ignite". Happily, some of the evening's better selections had been preserved on DG's video discs.

Deborah Voigt was "radiant" in "Dich teure Halle". Renée Fleming was "stunning" in both Der Rosenkavalier and an "expressive, detailed" excerpt from Louise. Ruth Ann Swenson was "appropriately sun-filled" in the Waltz Song from Roméo et Juliette. Frederica von Stade – a perennial Met darling – was "hysterically funny" in the tipsy aria from La Périchole. And in a "forthright" "O don fatale", Dolora Zajick brought the house down.

J. B. Steane reviewed the CD of the gala in Gramophone in December 1998. "Out come the stars," he wrote, "one by one or two by two and then six of them in a galaxy. Some have been in the firmament a long time, others are almost new. But all are there ... to pay tribute".

There was no doubt that the gala must have been a delightful celebration, but the wisest rule for such events was to record them in one's memory rather than on tape. This was not to say that the CD was without merit. Renée Fleming sang really beautifully in "Depuis le jour" from the line "Au jardin de mon cœur" onwards, and Ruth Ann Swenson essayed a brave and fruitful soft passage halfway through Juliet's waltz. But the album's senior contributors sounded below their best, and even their younger colleagues never rose to real greatness.

It was possible that this was partly to do with the disc's audio quality. Fleming's and Bryn Terfel's voices did not sound as attractive on the CD as they did when heard in person. Indeed, the playing of the Met orchestra was more enjoyable to listen to than any of the singers, and both were surpassed by the album's closing speech by Birgit Nilsson. After explaining how Swedes customarily behaved on such occasions, she said: "'But since I am a daughter of the Vikings, I will do it my way.' Then, with no more than a second's pause and no more than a semitone's adjustment of pitch, she gives vent to a mighty 'Hojotoho', and her top B-flat brings down the house".

The gala was also discussed in Clyde T. McCants's American opera singers and their recordings.

Broadcast and home media history
The gala was televised in a live transmission on PBS, and was also broadcast in Australia, Denmark, Japan, the Netherlands, Sweden and the United Kingdom.

In 1996, Deutsche Grammophon released versions of the gala in three formats. Thirteen excerpts were released on a 72-minute CD (catalogue number 449-177-2), accompanied by a 24-page insert booklet with an essay by Cory Ellison in English, French, German and Italian, and with production photographs of Alagna, Terfel, Fleming, Domingo, Ramey, Cotrubas, Zajick, Te Kanawa, Hong, Hadley, Robbins, Swenson, Mattila, Hagegård, Kraus, Bumbry, Voigt, von Stade, von Otter, Murphy, Nilsson and Levine. Twenty excerpts were issued on a 161-minute pair of CLV (constant linear velocity) CX-encoded Laserdiscs (catalogue number 072-551-1) with 4:3 NTSC colour video and digital audio. The same excerpts were issued on a VHS videocassette (catalogue number 072-451-3) with 4:3 PAL colour video and digital audio.

In 2005, Deutsche Grammophon released thirty-three excerpts from the gala on a 293-minute pair of DVDs (catalogue number B0004602-09), with 4:3 NTSC colour video and audio in PCM stereo and an ersatz 5.1-channel surround sound upmix in both DTS and Dolby Digital. The DVDs include an interview with Levine, a picture gallery and trailers, and are accompanied by a 12-page insert booklet with an essay by Kenneth Chalmers in English only. They omit the contributions made to the gala by Maria Ewing, Gwyneth Jones, Richard Leech, Jessye Norman and Sharon Sweet, as well as an excerpt from Werther sung by Alfredo Kraus that can be heard on Deutsche Grammophon's CD.

Gallery of artists

See also
 The Metropolitan Opera Centennial Gala
 The Metropolitan Opera Gala 1991

References

1996 classical albums
1996 television films
1996 films
Classical video albums
Deutsche Grammophon albums
Events in New York City
Live classical albums
Metropolitan Opera
Opera recordings